The 2011 season for the  cycling team began in January at the Tour Down Under and ended in October with Michael Matthews' participation in the Noosa Grand Prix. As a UCI ProTeam, they were automatically invited and obligated to send a squad to every event in the UCI World Tour.

The team had 24 victories in 2011, including stage wins at each Grand Tour. Pieter Weening held the race leader's pink jersey at the Giro d'Italia for four days, and Bauke Mollema also won the points jersey at the Vuelta a España, without winning any stage. No rider was especially more prolific than any other – Michael Matthews, Lars Boom, Robert Gesink, and Theo Bos each had multiple wins. Their most successful individual race was the Tour of Oman, where they took four stage wins, the overall crown, and the youth classification. The team took victories in every month of the season except October.

2011 roster
Ages as of January 1, 2011

Riders who joined the team for the 2011 season

Riders who left the team during or after the 2010 season

One-day races

Spring classics
In the days leading up to the spring season's traditional opener, Omloop Het Nieuwsblad, there was talk that many teams in the race would protest the UCI's ban on two-way radios in all races ranked 1.HC, 2.HC, and below. Rabobank, and in particular team manager Breukink, are among the ban's most vocal opponents, and they were at the forefront of the planned protest, promising to take the start with earpieces in place. It subsequently emerged that the planned protest would result in the UCI withdrawing its officials just as they had at the Trofeo Palma de Mallorca earlier in the season, and nullify any results. This would result in the race's insurance policies being voided and quite possibly cause the race to be canceled altogether. The teams decided on a majority vote to cancel the protest and race without radios, while promising to carry the protest to other races. In a remarkable irony, a Rabobank rider won the race – Langeveld won a two-man sprint over defending champion Juan Antonio Flecha by a matter of centimeters.

The team got a strong result at the season's third monument classic, Paris–Roubaix. After an aggressive first two hour of racing that covered the near  before the first cobbled sector, Tjallingii worked his way into a ten-man escape group. After the Arenberg sector, the lead group had swelled to 21 riders. Little by little, the reverse occurred as the speed increased. Tjallingii stayed at the front of the race until 's Johan Vansummeren put in a solo attack  from the finish line, and was not seen again, staying out front for victory. From the group behind, Fabian Cancellara put in his most intensive dig at that point and caught every remaining member of the breakaway group (save for Vansummeren). Tjallingii stayed with him, and they along with 's Grégory Rast contested the sprint for second place. Cancellara finished second, and Tjallingii third ahead of Rast. Tjallingii called the result the "greatest day ever" in his career, and was ecstatic that he had made the podium and had not slipped to fourth place.

Ambitious as always to win the most prestigious race of the season held in the Netherlands, the Amstel Gold Race, the team sent a strong squad including Gesink, Freire, Sánchez, Tankink, and Tjallingii. They were noted, however, to be underdogs to defending race champion Philippe Gilbert. Gesink, Freire, and Sánchez all sat on wheels and stayed with the front group for the majority of the race. Sánchez tried a solo attack for victory, but was chased down by Damiano Cunego and Stijn Devolder. In the end, Gilbert rode away from the field on the short uphill finish, securing the repeat victory. Rabobank did, however, place three finishers in the top ten, and were the only team to do so. These were Freire in sixth, Gesink in ninth, and Martens in tenth. Martens turned in decent rides at the other two Ardennes classics, with a 10th place in La Flèche Wallonne and 13th in Liège–Bastogne–Liège, the team's highest finisher in both events. Matthews took a field sprint win at the Rund um Köln the day after Liège–Bastogne–Liège. Matthews took the race win ahead of another German, Marcel Kittel, who rode for his regular trade team .

The team also sent squads to the Trofeo Palma de Mallorca, Trofeo Cala Millor, the Clásica de Almería, Kuurne–Brussels–Kuurne, Milan–San Remo, Gullegem Koerse and Halle–Ingooigem, but placed no higher than 11th in any of these races.

Fall races
The team also sent squads to the Vattenfall Cyclassics, the GP Ouest-France, the Memorial Rik Van Steenbergen, the Grand Prix Cycliste de Montréal, the Grand Prix d'Isbergues, Binche–Tournai–Binche, Paris–Tours, the Giro di Lombardia, and the Noosa Grand Prix, but finished no higher than 11th in any of these races.

Stage races

Matthews scored the team's first victory in the first stage race of the season, the Tour Down Under. After a late split in the field in stage 3 led to 24 riders finishing seven seconds ahead of the next 23, Matthews won a depleted sprint ahead of defending Tour Down Under champion André Greipel and resultant race leader Matthew Goss. He finished the race fourth overall. In February, Boom won the prologue time trial to the Tour of Qatar. It was the first time trial in the Tour's nine-year history. Despite the very short distance, Boom still had a solid four-second gap over world time trial champion Fabian Cancellara in second. The team was wildly successful at the next UCI Asia Tour stop, the Tour of Oman, which was held shortly after the Tour of Qatar. Bos won the sprint finishes to stages 1 and 3, besting full fields including sprinters the likes of Mark Cavendish, Daniele Bennati, and Matthew Goss both times. While the first three stages were flat like those of its cousin race in Qatar, the fourth and fifth provided that a climber would likely win the Tour of Oman overall. Gesink won both of these stages, the first a road race concluding at Green Mountain which he dedicated to his late father. The next stage was a time trial, and Gesink's win was a bit of a surprise because time trialing is not considered to be a strength for him. He stated after the stage that the hilly course played to his strengths, as did the fact that, like the Tour of Qatar time trial, this one was ridden on normal bicycles. It was the first time trial that he had ever won as a professional; he had started the stage simply hoping to keep the race lead, and instead increased it to over a minute. The final stage was flat again, and though Bos was only tenth in the sprint finale, it capped off a hugely successful event for the team with four stage wins and the overall and youth classifications. Freire added to the team's successful early season at the Ruta del Sol, winning the last two stages in field sprints. These performances also won him the event's points classification. At Tirreno–Adriatico in March, the squad won the team time trial in stage 1, the first ever such stage in the Tirreno–Adriatico's 46-year history. Boom was therefore the first race leader, though he held the lead for only one day. Gesink briefly held the race lead as well, but he was unable to climb with the race's best riders and slipped to fourth after six stages. He turned in a second strong individual time trial performance in as many races to close out the event, moving back onto the podium in second after taking ninth in the closing ITT. He also won the race's youth classification, having led it for the entire event.

At the Tour of the Basque Country, Freire was one of the only true sprinters to enter the notoriously hilly race. Stage 5, while it contained seven categorized climbs, was likely to conducive to a select group sprint since the climbs occurring in the second half of the stage were not especially difficult. Forty-eight riders finished together at the end of the race, and Freire was first over the finish line. A short time later, though, Freire was stripped of his apparent win by the race jury and relegated to the back of the peloton, along with Sánchez, since the two had taken their hands off their handlebars to apparently push away other riders. The victory was transferred to 's Francesco Gavazzi. Freire called the penalty a "disgrace" and stated that the apparent push was Sánchez signaling him that he should pass him and begin his sprint. The squad nonetheless got a noteworthy result from the race – Gesink again turned in a strong time trial, seventh place in stage 6, and moved up to third place overall in the final standings. Tankink also won the event's sprints classification. Mollema had a strong Vuelta a Castilla y León later in April. After finishing at the front of the race in the first two stages, Mollema was second behind a solo breakaway winner on the race's only summit finish, the Laguna de los Peces. This ride gave him the overall race leadership. He rode to fourth place the next day in the individual time trial, but since Xavier Tondó did him 12 seconds better by finishing third, he lost the race lead to the Spaniard. The time gaps held steady the next day, making Mollema the second-place overall finisher. He also won the event's combination classification, and the Rabobank squad won the team award.

Matthews also won the sprint classification for the team, at the Delta Tour Zeeland. The team also sent squads to the Volta ao Algarve, Paris–Nice, Volta a Catalunya, the Three Days of de Panne, the Tour de Romandie, the Tour of California, the Tour of Belgium, the Ster ZLM Toer, the Brixia Tour, the Tour de Pologne, the Eneco Tour, the USA Pro Cycling Challenge, the Tour de Wallonie-Picarde and the Tour of Beijing, but did not achieve a stage win, classification win, or podium finish in any of them.

Grand Tours

Giro d'Italia

Tour de France

Vuelta a España

Season victories

Footnotes

References

2011 road cycling season by team
2011
2011 in Dutch sport